Olivério Popovitch (2 October 1911 – 10 May 1973) was a Brazilian rower. He competed in the men's coxed four event at the 1932 Summer Olympics.

References

1911 births
1973 deaths
Brazilian male rowers
Olympic rowers of Brazil
Rowers at the 1932 Summer Olympics
Place of birth missing